Rede Bahia de Televisão (also called as RBT or Rede Bahia) is a Brazilian statewide TV Globo-affiliated commercial broadcast television network owned by Rede Bahia. The network is headquartered at 123 Prof. Aristídes Novis Street in Salvador, Bahia. Rede Bahia is the only statewide television network in Bahia, covering all the 417 cities of the state.

Rede Bahia has six owned-and-operated stations throughout Bahia: TV Bahia in Salvador, TV Oeste in Barreiras, TV Santa Cruz in Itabuna, TV São Francisco in Juazeiro, TV Subaé in Feira de Santana, and TV Sudoeste in Vitória da Conquista.

History
The network began to be formed on March 10, 1985, when it was founded, by entrepreneurs ACM Júnior and César Mata Pires, the TV Bahia in Salvador. The station was affiliated with Rede Manchete from its foundation to January 23, 1987, when it became an Rede Globo affiliate. On November 5, 1988, TV Santa Cruz was inaugurated in Itabuna, being the first television station owned by Rede Bahia in the interior of the state, also affiliated with Rede Globo. TV Sudoeste was the second, being inaugurated on March 31, 1990, in Vitória da Conquista. TV São Francisco signed on in December 1 of the same year in Juazeiro, with the branding TV Norte, and TV Oeste was the last to be founded by the group, wenting on air on February 2, 1991, in Barreiras.

TV Subaé signed on the air on June 1, 1988, at Feira de Santana, being the first Rede Globo-affiliated station in the interior of Bahia, but it was not founded by Rede Bahia. Its founder was the businessman Modesto Cerqueira, and the station was part of Grupo Modesto Cerqueira. It was only in 1998 that the station became part of the statewide network, when the local group sold part of its shares to business partners of Grupo TV Bahia.

On July 2, 1998, the network adopted the nomenclature Rede Bahia de Televisão. The change took place at the same time that the conglomerate was renamed Rede Bahia.

In 2012, the quotas belonging to César Mata Pires in Rede Bahia were sold to the Coutinho Nogueira family, owner of the EP Group, owner of the regional television network based in cities of São Paulo and one city of Minas Gerais, EPTV, also an Globo affiliate.

In 2014, the network was the winner in the category "Biggest Audience" of Rede Globo's National Programming Award, among the participating affiliates of the National Television Panel. It was also one of the three finalists in the categories "Best Calls" (with the call of the match between Juazeirense and Juazeiro) and "Regional Line Programs" (with the local entertainment show Mosaico Baiano).

In May 2019, a process of dismissals was initiated at the network's stations, from journalists to employees, after financial losses suffered by the group in 2018. TV Oeste, from Barreiras, and TV São Francisco, from Juazeiro, stopped the production of local news programs due to the dismissal of employees. On the Juazeiro station, 16 were fired. The stations continued to produce reports for network programs and news bulletins.

On October 25, 2021, TV Oeste reactivated the production of local newscasts through the local edition of Bahia Meio Dia, with a duration of 30 minutes, anchored by Carlos Augusto.

Stations

Notes
 1TV Sudoeste used the callsign ZYA 303 from its 1990 sign-on to 2018.
 2TV São Francisco was branded as TV Norte from its 1990 sign-on to 2001.
 3TV São Francisco used the callsign ZYA 304 from its 1990 sign-on to 2019.

Cable and satellite availability
Rede Bahia is available in the state of Bahia, utilizing its stations, on cable providers NET, Oi TV, Vivo TV, Atel Telecom and TV Cabo Itabuna, in addition to being available on satellite operators Claro TV, Sky, Oi TV and Vivo TV. Only TV Oeste is not available locally on any of these providers.

Digital television
All the network's stations already officially operates on digital signal. TV Bahia was the first television station in the North/Northeast of Brazil to start digital broadcasting on December 1, 2008. The second O&O station of the network to activate digital broadcasting was TV Subaé, in July 2013, followed by TV Santa Cruz, that started digital operations in December of the same year. The stations TV Oeste and TV Sudoeste started their digital operations in April 2014, while TV São Francisco activated its signal in May, being the last station of the network to activate its digital signal.

Programs

News
Bahia Agora: News bulletin broadcast during the commercial breaks by TV Oeste (with reports by Carlos Augusto, Lo-Hanna Nunes and Marta Ortega) and TV São Francisco (with reports by Joyce Guirra and Kris de Lima), that presents the breaking news from the region.

Bahia Meio Dia: Newscast presented at noon from Monday to Saturday. In Salvador, it is anchored by Jessica Senra and Vanderson Nascimento. It has local editions produced from Monday to Friday by stations TV Oeste, TV Santa Cruz, TV Subaé and TV Sudoeste, anchored by Carlos Augusto, Roger Sarmento, Adilson Muritiba and Judson Almeida, respectively. On Saturdays, the version produced in Salvador by TV Bahia is broadcast statewide.

Bahia Rural: Rural news program aired on Sunday mornings, after Santa Missa em Seu Lar, inspired by the Globo's program Globo Rural. It brings news from the rural area of Bahia, in addition to presenting recipes from rural cuisine. It is presented by Georgina Maynart.

BATV: The network's nightly newscast, broadcast Monday to Saturday and anchored by Fernando Sodake. The program has local versions produced by TV Santa Cruz (anchored by Olga Amaral), TV Subaé (anchored by Heitor Figueiredo) and TV Sudoeste (anchored by Daniela Oliveira), with the first two blocks produced locally and the third produced by TV Bahia.

Bom Dia Sábado: Newscast aired on Saturday mornings. It is presented on the entire state, being anchored in a rotation scheme, by Thaic Carvalho and Vanderson Nascimento.

Globo Esporte Bahia: Local edition of Globo's sports news program Globo Esporte, aired statewide from Monday to Saturday, and anchored by Mariana Aragão.

Jornal da Manhã: The network's morning newscast, presented statewide from Monday to Friday, and anchored by Ricardo Ishmael and Thaic Carvalho.

Entertainment
Conexão Bahia: Variety program, presented by Aldri Anunciação. Presents content related to culture and tourism in Bahia. It airs on Saturday mornings, after Como Será?.

Mosaico Baiano: Variety program, presented by Luana Souza and Pablo Vasconcelos. Presents curiosities, clips, documentaries, special series, film tips, theater, concerts, artists, visits to neighborhoods, behavior, tourism, coverage of events in the city of Salvador. It airs on Saturday afternoons, after Jornal Hoje.

References

External links

G1 - Bahia (news)
GE - Bahia (sports)

Companies based in Bahia